Throw the Warped Wheel Out is the debut album from Scottish new wave band Fiction Factory. It was released in 1984 and included the UK and European hit single "(Feels Like) Heaven". The album failed to chart in the UK but was more successful in Europe, reaching the charts in Switzerland, Sweden and Germany.

Track listing

Critical reception

Upon release, Rolling Stone stated: "Fiction Factory are doubtless a most sincere bunch, and here they display excellent musicianship, lavish production and a dozen moderately tuneful songs. Unfortunately, they lack any real spark of originality..." Michael Sutton of AllMusic retrospectively wrote: "Any interest in Fiction Factory's Throw the Warped Wheel Out will most likely originate from the album's opening track, "(Feels Like) Heaven" - an '80s new wave classic. However, one song cannot carry the weight of an entire LP; fortunately, Fiction Factory were talented enough to craft worthy successors. Throw the Warped Wheel Out is a vastly underrated album, disappointing only record buyers who want every track to sound like "(Feels Like) Heaven."

Personnel
Fiction Factory
 Kevin Patterson – vocals
 Chic Medley – guitar
 Graham McGregor – bass
 Eddie Jordan – keyboards
 Mike Ogletree – drums, percussion

Additional musicians
 Graham Weir, Neil Weir – brass
 Grant Taylor – trumpet
 Alan Rankine – Synclavier

Production
 Peter Wilson – producer (1–4, 6–10)
 Alan Rankine – producer (5)
 Fiction Factory – remixing (4, 5, 10)

Other
 Rosław Szaybo – art direction
 John Crancher – styling
 David McIntyre – photography

Charts

References

1984 debut albums
Columbia Records albums
Fiction Factory albums